Idaea consanguiberica is a species of moth in the family Geometridae. It is found on the Iberian Peninsula.

References

Moths described in 1992
Sterrhini
Moths of Europe